Li Xiaopeng is the name of the following Chinese people:

Li Xiaopeng (politician) (born 1959), Minister of Transport
Li Xiaopeng (footballer) (born 1975), professional soccer player
Li Xiaopeng (gymnast) (born 1981), Olympic gymnast

See also
 Li (disambiguation)
 Li Xiaoping, gymnast
 Lu Xiaopeng, aircraft designer 
 Xiaopeng (disambiguation)